In enzymology, a lactosylceramide 4-alpha-galactosyltransferase is an enzyme that catalyzes the chemical reaction

UDP-galactose + beta-D-galactosyl-(1->4)-D-glucosylceramide  UDP + alpha-D-galactosyl-(1->4)-beta-D-galactosyl-(1->4)-D- glucosylceramide

Thus, the two substrates of this enzyme are UDP-galactose and [[beta-D-galactosyl-(1->4)-D-glucosylceramide]], whereas its 3 products are UDP, [[alpha-D-galactosyl-(1->4)-beta-D-galactosyl-(1->4)-D-]], and glucosylceramide.

This enzyme belongs to the family of glycosyltransferases, specifically the hexosyltransferases.  The systematic name of this enzyme class is UDP-galactose:lactosylceramide 4II-alpha-D-galactosyltransferase. Other names in common use include Galbeta1-4Glcbeta1-Cer alpha1,4-galactosyltransferase, globotriaosylceramide/CD77 synthase, and histo-blood group Pk UDP-galactose.  This enzyme participates in glycosphingolipid biosynthesis - globoseries and glycan structures - biosynthesis 2.

References

 
 
 

EC 2.4.1
Enzymes of unknown structure